Charles Christopher Morel Warren (born 11 March 1979) is an Irish former first-class cricketer.

Warren was born at Portadown in Northern Ireland in March 1979. He later studied for his degree in England at Worcester College, Oxford. While studying at Oxford, Warren played first-class cricket. He made his debut for an Oxford Universities side, making three first-class appearances in 2000. The Oxford Universities team was a forerunner to Oxford UCCE which was formed the following year, with Warren subsequently representing Oxford UCCE in three first-class matches, with two appearances in 2001 and a single appearance in 2002. He also made two first-class appearances for Oxford University against Cambridge University in The University Matches of 2001 and 2002. In eight first-class matches, Warren scored 149 runs at an average of 12.41, with a high score of 40 not out.

Notes and references

External links

1979 births
Living people
People from Portadown
Alumni of Worcester College, Oxford
Irish cricketers
Cricketers from Northern Ireland
Oxford University cricketers
Oxford Universities cricketers
Oxford MCCU cricketers